Karinen is an extinct town in Harding County, in the U.S. state of South Dakota. The GNIS classifies it as a populated place.

History
A post office called Karinen was established in 1907, and remained in operation until 1953. The town has the name of the local Karinen family.

References

Ghost towns in South Dakota
Geography of Harding County, South Dakota